Roseovarius litoreus is a species of bacteria. It is gram-negative, non-flagellated and ovoid- to rod-shaped. Its type strain is GSW-M15T (=KCTC 23897T = CCUG 62218T).

References

Further reading
Whitman, William B., et al., eds. Bergey's manual® of systematic bacteriology. Vol. 5. Springer, 2012.

External links
LPSN

Type strain of Roseovarius litoreus at BacDive -  the Bacterial Diversity Metadatabase

Rhodobacteraceae
Bacteria described in 2012